Astro Magnetics is an imprint label of Eyeball Records and is owned by Marc Debiak, Alex Saavedra and Thursday's Geoff Rickly.

Astro Magnetics bands
 The Blackout Pact
 Baumer
 The Bronze Episode
 Jettie
 Kiss Kiss
 The Lovekill
 Metroid
 The Valley Arena
 Secret Lives of the Freemasons (until June 2007)

See also 
 List of record labels

External links
 Official site

American record labels